The Vanil Noir (local  ) is a mountain of the Fribourg Prealps, located on the border between the cantons of Fribourg and Vaud in western Switzerland. Reaching a height of 2,389 metres above sea level, the Vanil Noir is the highest summit of the canton of Fribourg and of the Alpine foothills lying north of the Saane and Simme (or northwest of the Saanenmöser Pass). It is also the northernmost point in the canton of Vaud above 2,300 metres and the most prominent summit of both cantons.

The Vanil Noir is the culminating point of the range separating the regions of Gruyère and Pays-d'Enhaut, although it is followed by the almost equally high Vanil de l'Ecri and Pointe de Paray. With these two mountains, it forms a large cirque on the south and east side, overlooking the alp of Paray Doréna. On the west side, it consists of a smaller cirque, overlooking the alp of Bounavau. On the northeast side it overlooks the valley of Les Morteys. All three valleys descending from the Vanil Noir are part of the Saane drainage basin.

The closest localities are Grandvillard (Fribourg) and Château d'Oex (Vaud). Several vertiginous trails lead to the summit, and cross it from north to south. The Vanil Noir is part of a nature reserve since 1983.

See also
List of mountains of Switzerland
List of mountains of Vaud
List of most isolated mountains of Switzerland

References

External links

Vanil Noir on Hikr
Vanil Noir Nature Reserve

Mountains of the canton of Vaud
Mountains of the canton of Fribourg
Mountains of Switzerland
Mountains of the Alps
Highest points of Swiss cantons
Fribourg–Vaud border
Two-thousanders of Switzerland